Imesh Madushanka (born 29 March 1998) is a Sri Lankan cricketer. He made his List A debut on 22 December 2019, for Kandy Customs Cricket Club in the 2019–20 Invitation Limited Over Tournament.

References

External links
 

1998 births
Living people
Sri Lankan cricketers
Kandy Customs Sports Club cricketers
Place of birth missing (living people)